Adris Grupa d.d. is a Croatian diversified conglomerate based in Rovinj. It has more than 8,000 employees, and is one of the leading companies in the region, with an annual income of more than 5 billion kunas (around 1 bln dollars).

Since the sale of Tvornica duhana Rovinj (TDR) to British American Tobacco in September 2015, its core businesses are Maistra (tourism and hotels), Cromaris (food industry), and Croatia osiguranje (insurance). It also operates a public internship and employment program called "The Future in Adris" and The Adris Foundation, which awards scholarships and donations.

It's being traded on Zagreb Stock Exchange with a ticker ZSE. In June 2022, Adris announced a one-year share buyback programme.

References

External links
 

Companies listed on the Zagreb Stock Exchange
Tobacco companies of Croatia
Manufacturing companies established in 1872
1872 establishments in Austria-Hungary
Holding companies of Croatia
Croatian companies established in 2003
Companies of Croatia